Ritvars Gulbis (born 31 January 1980) is a Latvian curler and curling coach.

One of the most awarded curlers in Latvia – as of May 2018 he is a twelve-time Latvian men's champion curler (2005, 2007, 2008, 2009, 2010, 2011, 2012, 2013, 2014, 2015, 2016, 2018) and two-time Latvian mixed doubles champion curler (2017, 2018).

Teams

Men's

Mixed

Mixed doubles

Record as a coach of national teams

References

External links

Living people
1980 births
Sportspeople from Riga
Latvian male curlers
Latvian curling champions
Latvian curling coaches
21st-century Latvian people